Cleopatra is a 1934 American epic film directed by Cecil B. DeMille and distributed by Paramount Pictures. A retelling of the story of Cleopatra VII of Egypt, the screenplay was written by Waldemar Young and Vincent Lawrence and was based on Bartlett Cormack's adaptation of historical material. Claudette Colbert stars as Cleopatra, Warren William as Julius Caesar, and Henry Wilcoxon as Mark Antony.

Cleopatra received five Academy Award nominations. It was the first DeMille film to receive a nomination for Best Picture. Victor Milner won the Academy Award for Best Cinematography.

Plot

In 48 BC, Cleopatra vies with her brother Ptolemy for control of Egypt. Pothinos (Leonard Mudie) kidnaps her and Apollodorus (Irving Pichel) and strands them in the desert. When Pothinos informs Julius Caesar that the queen has fled the country, Caesar is ready to sign an agreement with Ptolemy when Apollodorus appears, bearing a gift carpet for the Roman. When Apollodorus unrolls it, Cleopatra emerges, much to Pothinos' surprise. He tries to deny who she is.

Caesar sees through the deception, and Cleopatra soon beguiles Caesar with the prospect of the riches of Egypt and India. Later, when they are seemingly alone, she spots a sandal peeking out from underneath a curtain and thrusts a spear into the hidden Pothinos, foiling his assassination attempt. Caesar makes Cleopatra the sole ruler of Egypt, and begins an affair with her.

Caesar eventually returns to Rome with Cleopatra to the cheers of the masses but Roman unease is directed at Cleopatra. Cassius (Ian Maclaren), Casca (Edwin Maxwell), Brutus (Arthur Hohl) and other powerful Romans become disgruntled, rightly suspecting that he intends to abolish the Roman Republic and make himself emperor, with Cleopatra as his empress (after divorcing Calpurnia, played by Gertrude Michael). Ignoring the forebodings of Calpurnia, Cleopatra, and a soothsayer (Harry Beresford) who warns him about the Ides of March, Caesar goes to announce his intentions to the Senate. Before he can do so, he is assassinated.
 
Cleopatra is heartbroken at the news. At first, she wants to go to him, but Apollodorus tells her that Caesar did not love her, only her power and wealth, and that Egypt needs her. They return home.

Bitter rivals Marc Antony and Octavian (Ian Keith) are named co-rulers of Rome. Antony, disdainful of women, invites Cleopatra to meet with him in Tarsus, intending to bring her back to Rome as a captive. Enobarbus (C. Aubrey Smith), his close friend, warns Antony against meeting Cleopatra, but he goes anyway. She entices him to her barge and throws a party with many exotic animals and beautiful dancers, and soon seduces him. Together, they sail to Egypt.

King Herod (Joseph Schildkraut), who has secretly allied himself with Octavian, visits the lovers. He informs Cleopatra privately that Rome and Octavian can be appeased if Antony were to be poisoned. Herod also tells Antony the same thing, with the roles reversed. Antony laughs off his suggestion, but a reluctant Cleopatra, reminded of her duty to Egypt by Apollodorus, tests a poison on a condemned murderer (Edgar Dearing) to see how it works. Before Antony can drink the fatal wine, however, they receive news that Octavian has declared war.

Antony orders his generals and legions to gather, but Enobarbus informs him that they have all deserted out of loyalty to Rome. Enobarbus tells his comrade that he can wrest control of Rome away from Octavian by having Cleopatra killed, but Antony refuses to consider it. Enobarbus bids Antony goodbye, as he will not fight for an Egyptian queen against Rome.  A short montage sequence shows the fighting between the forces of Antony and Octavian, ending in the naval Battle of Actium.

Antony fights on with the Egyptian army, and is defeated. Octavian and his soldiers surround and besiege Antony and Cleopatra. Antony is mocked when he offers to fight them one by one. Without his knowledge, Cleopatra opens the gate and offers to cede Egypt in return for Antony's life in exile, but Octavian turns her down. Meanwhile, Antony believes that she has deserted him for his rival and stabs himself. When Cleopatra returns, she is heartbroken to find him dying. They reconcile before he perishes. Then, with the gates breached, Cleopatra kills herself with a venomous snake and is found sitting on her throne, dead.

Cast

The closing credits list 32 actors and the names of their characters:

 Claudette Colbert as Cleopatra
 Warren William as Julius Caesar
 Henry Wilcoxon as Marc Antony
 Joseph Schildkraut as King Herod
 Ian Keith as Octavian
 Gertrude Michael as Calpurnia
 C. Aubrey Smith as Enobarbus
 Irving Pichel as Apollodorus
 Arthur Hohl as Brutus
 Edwin Maxwell as Casca
 Ian Maclaren as Cassius
 Eleanor Phelps as Charmion, Cleopatra's servant
 Leonard Mudie as Pothinos
 Grace Durkin as Iras, Cleopatra's servant
 Ferdinand Gottschalk as Glabrio
 Claudia Dell as Octavia

 Harry Beresford as Soothsayer
 Jayne Regan as Lady Vesta (as Jane Regan)
 William Farnum as Lepidus
 Lionel Belmore as Fidius
 Florence Roberts as Lady Flora
 Richard Alexander as General Philodemas
 Celia Ryland as Lady Leda
 William V. Mong as Court physician
 Robert Warwick as General Achillas
 George Walsh as Courier
 Jack Rutherford as Flavius
 Kenneth Gibson as Scribe
 Wedgewood Nowell as Scribe
 Bruce Warren as Scribe
 Robert Seiter as Aelius (as Robert Manning)
 Edgar Dearing as the convict who tests the poison

Production

The shoot was a difficult one due to Colbert contracting appendicitis on the set of her previous film, Four Frightened People, leaving her only able to stand for a few minutes at a time. Heavy costumes complicated matters further. Due to Colbert's fear of snakes, DeMille put off her death scene for as long as possible. At the time of shooting, he walked onto the set with a boa constrictor wrapped around his neck and handed Colbert a tiny garden snake.

On July 1, 1934, the Motion Picture Production Code began to be rigidly enforced and expanded by Joseph Breen. Talkie films made before that date are generally referred to as "pre-Code" films. However, DeMille was able to get away with using more risqué imagery than he would be able to do in his later productions. He opens the film with an apparently naked, but strategically lit slave girl holding up an incense burner in each hand as the title appears on screen.

The film is also memorable for the sumptuous art deco look of its sets (by Hans Dreier) and costumes (by Travis Banton), the atmospheric music composed by Rudolph George Kopp, and for DeMille's legendary set piece of Cleopatra's seduction of Antony, which takes place on Cleopatra's barge. Colbert later said, "DeMille's films were special: somehow when he put everything together, there was a special kind of glamour and sincerity."

Release
Cleopatra received its world premiere on August 16, 1934, at the Paramount Theatre in New York City. The premiere audience, which gave the film an ovation, included social leaders, diplomats, and famous stars of stage and film. In its first week at the Paramount, the film set an annual record with 110,383 admissions. Cleopatra went on to become the highest-grossing film released in North America in 1934.

Reception
Mordaunt Hall of The New York Times called it "one of the director's most ambitious spectacles" and singled out Wilcoxon's performance as "excellent, especially in the more dramatic sequences." Film Daily called it a "sumptuous historical drama" with a "strong cast" and "good entertainment values". John Mosher of The New Yorker wrote that "Even as extravaganza it's moderate", and called the dialogue "the worst I have ever heard in the talkies." Variety agreed that "Often the lines drew titters that are not being angled for", but maintained, "Photographically the picture is superb."

In his Movie Guide, film critic Leonard Maltin gave Cleopatra 3.5 out of 4 stars and wrote, "Opulent DeMille version of Cleopatra doesn't date badly, stands out as one of his most intelligent films, thanks in large part to fine performances by all."

Accolades
At the 7th Academy Awards in 1935, Cleopatra won for Best Cinematography (Victor Milner). It was nominated for four more awards: Outstanding Production (Paramount), Best Assistant Director (Cullen Tate), Best Film Editing (Anne Bauchens), and Best Sound Recording (Franklin Hansen). In the January 1935 issue of The New Movie Magazine, Claudette Colbert's performance in Cleopatra was named the "Movie Highlight of the Year" for August 1934, the month in which the film premiered.

In 2002, the American Film Institute nominated Cleopatra for the AFI's 100 Years...100 Passions list.

Home media
Cleopatra, along with  The Sign of the Cross, Four Frightened People, The Crusades and Union Pacific, was released on DVD in 2006 by Universal Studios as part of the five-disc box set The Cecil B. DeMille Collection.

It has been released for home viewing several times in the United States of America, including a 75th anniversary DVD edition in 2009 by Universal Studios Home Entertainment.

In the United Kingdom, Cleopatra was released in a Dual Format DVD and Blu-ray edition on September 24, 2012, by Eureka as part of their Masters of Cinema series.

On April 10, 2018, Universal Pictures Home Entertainment released the film on Blu-ray.

References

Bibliography

External links

Cleopatra at Cecil B. DeMille's Official Website

1934 films
1930s biographical films
1930s historical films
American biographical films
American epic films
Cultural depictions of Calpurnia (wife of Caesar)
1930s English-language films
American black-and-white films
Films based on Antony and Cleopatra
Depictions of Augustus on film
Depictions of Cleopatra on film
Depictions of Herod the Great on film
Depictions of Julius Caesar on film
Depictions of Mark Antony on film
Final War of the Roman Republic films
Films set in the 1st century BC
Films set in ancient Egypt
Films set in ancient Alexandria
Films whose cinematographer won the Best Cinematography Academy Award
Paramount Pictures films
Films directed by Cecil B. DeMille
Articles containing video clips
1930s American films